Arbitration Place is an internationally affiliated arbitration facility and legal centre located in the Bay-Adelaide Centre, in Toronto, Canada.

Profile
Arbitration Place hosts domestic and international arbitrations and facilitates these arbitrations through legal and administrative services such as on-site court reporting, videoconferencing, technical support, closed-captioning, interpreters, translators, and in-house legal counsel.  Resident arbitrators include Yves Fortier, past President of the London Court of International Arbitration, and the Honourable Ian Binnie, former Justice of the Supreme Court of Canada.  As Ian Binnie notes in an interview with Evan Solomon, the aim of Arbitration Place is to position Canada as a forum for international commercial arbitration.

Partnerships 
Arbitration Place maintains partnerships with the London Court of International Arbitration (LCIA) and with ICC Canada, the Canadian national committee of the International Court of Arbitration of the International Chamber of Commerce.

Resident Arbitrators 
 Ian Binnie
 Robert P. Armstrong
 Stan Fisher 
 Yves Fortier
 Thomas Heintzman 
 Coulter Osborne

Member Arbitrators 
 Louise Barrington 
 Earl Cherniak  
 Konrad von Finckenstein
 John Judge
 Barry Leon 
 John Lorn McDougall 
 Graeme Mew
 Joseph R. Nuss
 Harry Radomski
 Janet Walker

References 

Arbitration organizations

Legal organizations based in Ontario
Organizations based in Toronto